Chatburn railway station once served the small village of Chatburn in Lancashire, England.

History 
The original single line opened in June 1850 and terminated at a platform to the rear of the Pendle Hotel. Some of the first platform stone work is still in situ (as of July 2016). The station west of Clitheroe road was opened in 1872 by the Lancashire and Yorkshire Railway and until 1879, was at the end of the line from Blackburn. There was at one stage a turntable, it was situated east of Clitheroe road on the flat ground in the area of the existing station building.

The line was doubled up from 1872 to 1874, and work on the line onwards towards Gisburn and Hellifield began in 1874. Initially it opened to Gisburn in June 1879, and was running to Helifield twelve months later. The bigger replacement station east of Clitheroe Road closed to passengers after ninety years, shortly before the publication of the Beeching Report.

Chatburn station had its own goods depot, with multiple sidings and a large goods shed. The depot is now Pendle Trading Estate; the large goods shed is used as a vehicle repair shop. There was a crane, a weighing machine and a signal box, which would be shared with Dixon Robinson's Bold Venture Lime Works, with points on the opposite side of the main line.

The main station building has been used as storage and stables since the mid-1960s, and the second brick built station master's house, on approach to station building, has been in private hands from the same time. The original Victorian station masters house is still in situation at the side of the Clitheroe road, and was used as the weighbridge and offices for the Bold Venture Lime Works for many years. It has stood empty since 2006.

Services

References 

Lancashire Steam Finale by Michael S. Welch

Disused railway stations in Ribble Valley
Former Lancashire and Yorkshire Railway stations
Railway stations in Great Britain opened in 1872
Railway stations in Great Britain closed in 1962